An election to the Islamic City Council of Tehran took place on 14 June 2013, along with the local elections nationwide.

The council is elected by the plurality-at-large voting system. The Principlists gained majority with 18 seats, while the Reformists had endorsed 13 winners in their list.

Results

References

Tehran
2013
2010s in Iran